Max Wechsler (born 6 October 1938) is a former Swiss cyclist. He competed in the individual road race at the 1960 Summer Olympics.

References

External links
 

1938 births
Living people
People from Willisau District
Swiss male cyclists
Olympic cyclists of Switzerland
Cyclists at the 1960 Summer Olympics
Sportspeople from the canton of Lucerne